Brazil competed in the 2021 Junior Pan American Games in Cali–Valle, Colombia from 25 November to 5 December 2021.

A flag bearers at the opening ceremony were skateboarder Pamela Rosa and swimmer Breno Correia. At the closing ceremony flag bearer was table tennis player Giulia Takahashi, who won four medals.

Brazil won the most gold medals and won the medal table. Brazil get 59 gold, 49 silver and 56 bronze medals.

Competitors 
The following is the list of number of competitors (per gender) participating at the games per sport.

Miguel Hidalgo started in athletics and triathlon.
Amanda Kunkel, Yana Camargo, Otávio Gonzeli and Pedro Guilherme Rossi started in cycling road and cycling track.

Medalists

References 

Nations at the 2021 Junior Pan American Games